The Hotel SOFIA Barcelona is a skyscraper hotel near Avinguda Diagonal (Diagonal Avenue) in Barcelona, Catalonia, Spain. It has 22 floors and rises 79 meters. The hotel was completed in 1975 as the Hotel Princesa Sofia. It was renamed InterContinental Princesa Sofia in 1996, then the Gran Hotel Princesa Sofia in 2004. It was completely renovated in 2017 and renamed Hotel SOFIA Barcelona. It joined The Unbound Collection of Hyatt Hotels in December 2018.

See also 
 List of tallest buildings and structures in Barcelona

External links 
 Official page of SOFIA Hotel

References 

Hotel buildings completed in 1975
2017 establishments in Catalonia